Atlantic College Lifeboat Station (based in Atlantic College, South Wales, a United World College) opened in 1963 (shortly after the school had been launched the previous autumn)  as one of the first experimental inshore lifeboat stations established by the RNLI.

The RNLI withdrew the lifeboat from Atlantic College in June 2013. The college now concentrates on training beach lifeguards.

History

B-class development
Atlantic College was instrumental in the design and development of the RNLI's first fast rescue boats under the supervision of the headmaster, Rear Admiral Desmond Hoare. He was the pioneer of the revolutionary Rigid Inflatable Boat (RIB) and of the prototype for the eventual   lifeboat, which was named after the college and entered service in the early 1970s. 

In the early 1960s the college began designing, building and experimenting with the operation of a series of rigid inflatable boat, one of which eventually became the basis for the B-class. The chief innovation was the design, construction and testing of a rigid hull attached to inflatable tubes, for previously the inflatable boat bottoms were made of flexible, rubberized fabric that was kept taught under load through the use of collapsible inboard floorboards that formed the boat’s deck.  This notable and novel innovation was in response to the rough seas, breaking surf and rocky shore conditions at the college’s St Donats Bay seafront access, in which school rescue craft had to be launched, operated and recovered.  

The college sold the RIB patent to the RNLI for £1 in 1973. An early example was discovered in Barry in 2012 and restored in 2014.

First female crewmember
On 20 May 1971, the station recorded the first service at any station involving a female crew member taking part. Penelope M. Sutton was a member of the crew when the ILB was launched to investigate a Swedish motor cruiser, reported to be at anchor and flying a distress signal. The incident was a false alarm, as the courtesy Red Ensign flown on the cruiser had been misinterpreted.

RNLI lifeboat station

In 1973, the station received its first standardized RNLI Atlantic 21 lifeboat. Previous lifeboats operated by the station were owned by the college with the RNLI paying for the operating expenses.

In 2000, the station received a slightly longer and larger  lifeboat at roughly 24 feet in length. The RNLI withdrew their standardized lifeboat in June 2013. Helmsman training time had increased from one to two years, so it became no longer practical to train students as helms during the two year College (International Baccalaureate Diploma) program (two years of study).

Heritage Continues
In 2015, Atlantic College joined a number of other organisations to campaign for the establishment of a lifeboat service in Japan, coordinated by college alumnus and current RNLI crew member Robin Jenkins. Innovation continues with the introduction of a 4.3 metre RHIB powered by a 40 hp / 30 kw outboard engine with propeller guard that can fit into a standard shipping container for shipment over to Kamaishi in north eastern Japan, where the container serves as a mobile lifeboat station (equipped with crew change area, tools and maintenance mini-bay and boat storage on a launching dolly.)

Atlantic Pacific International Rescue Boats, a non-governmental organization, works with Atlantic College students to build these Hahn class rigid hull inflatable boats for humanitarian relief purposes. An example is a rescue boat that was transported to Lesvos Greece under the logistical efforts of AC alumnus Richard Chamberlain, for ongoing use in supporting the migrant refugee crisis by volunteers.  Soon another craft and mobile station will end up in north eastern Africa.

Fleet

Station Honours
Letters of Appreciation - 1968
Letters of Appreciation were sent to G Unger, W de Vogel and P Allen in recognition of their services on 11 November when four men were rescued from the wreck of the dredger Steepholm.

References

External links
Atlantic College
Atlantic Pacific International Rescue Boat Project

Lifeboat stations in Wales
Transport infrastructure completed in 1963